Pranav Vatsa (born 7 June 1986) is an Indian film lyricist, writer and director in Bollywood cinema, known for his popular DJ song of Hey Bro film as a lyricist writer. after that vatsa give  more hits song to bollywood in thr film Tutak Tutak Tutiya, FU friendship Unlimited, Dehati Disco and more.

Early life
Pranav was born on 7 June 1986 in Bhagalpur District of Bihar. He completed his schooling and graduation from Bhagalpur District's college and high School.

Career
Vatsa started his career from theater as an actor and director in 1999 from his home district Bhagalpur.

Filmography

Music videos

References

External links
 
 
 
 

1982 births
Living people
Indian lyricists